Danielle Belton (born c.1977) is an American journalist who is the editor-in-chief of HuffPost. She worked with local and national publications, as well as developing a television series for BET. After joining The Root in 2015, she became its youngest managing editor and its first editor-in-chief. In 2021 she was selected as editor of HuffPost.

Early life and education
Belton grew up in Black Jack and Florissant, Missouri. After graduating from Hazelwood Central High School, she attended Southern Illinois University Edwardsville, where she received a Bachelor's degree in English and Journalism.

Career
She started her journalism career with The Bakersfield Californian, a local newspaper in Bakersfield, California. In 2007 she started the 'Black Snob', an award-winning blog.

In 2011 she worked on developing a television show for Black Entertainment Television (BET) called Don't Sleep, hosted by T. J. Holmes; she became its head writer. Although the show was cancelled after 8 months, it was nominated for an NAACP Image Award in 2013.

In 2015 Belton joined The Root, where she was appointed as managing editor in 2016. She was appointed as its first editor-in-chief.

References 

Living people
American newspaper editors
American women journalists
Southern Illinois University Edwardsville alumni
Year of birth missing (living people)
21st-century American women